is an anime series by Studio Pierrot. The 33 episode series aired on Fuji Television (CX) from October 18, 1989, to July 6, 1990.

The series stars Hat, the descendant of a hero who fought an evil king and sealed Devildom. Hat falls into Devildom and finds he has to defeat the evil king.

The 1990 Mega Drive game  is based on this series. Due to the game's developer failing to secure the Magical Hat license outside Japan, it was completely redone and released in 1991 as Decap Attack. The game features different characters, story, art, music, and level design, but the same general gameplay.

References

External links
Official Pierrot website 
Official Pierrot website 

1989 anime television series debuts
1989 Japanese television series debuts
1990 Japanese television series endings
1990 video games
Fuji TV original programming
Pierrot (company)